Maarten Houttuyn or Houttuijn (1720 – 2 May 1798; Latinised as Martinus Houttuyn) was a Dutch naturalist.

Houttuyn was born in Hoorn, studied medicine in Leiden and moved to Amsterdam in 1753. He published many books on natural history, e.g. Natuurlyke Historie of uitvoerige Beschryving der Dieren, Planten en Mineraalen, volgens het Samenstel van den Heer Linnaeus, in 37 volumes (1761-1773), following Carl Linnaeus' division into the animal kingdom, the plant kingdom, and the mineral kingdom. His areas of interest encompassed Pteridophytes, Bryophytes and Spermatophytes.   He died in Amsterdam.  In botanical nomenclature, the standard author abbreviation Houtt. is applied to plants described by him. He is commemorated by the genus Houttuynia, a member of the Saururaceae from China and Japan.

Martinus Houttuyn was the co-writer of the volumes 2, 3, 4 and 5 of Nederlandsche Vogelen. The first author was Cornelius Nozeman.

References

External links
 'Houtkunde' – A representation of inland and foreign wood by Martinus Houttuyn, 1773
 ipni.org The International Plant Names Index 
 M. Boeseman, W. de Ligny, Martinus Houttuyn (1720–1798) and his contributions to the natural sciences, with emphasis on zoology, Zoologische Verhandelingen 349, 2004, p. 1-222 PDF

1720 births
1798 deaths
18th-century Dutch botanists
18th-century Dutch naturalists
Dutch entomologists
People from Hoorn
Leiden University alumni
18th-century Danish zoologists